The Global Leaders Group on Antimicrobial Resistance consists of world leaders and experts from across sectors working together to accelerate political action on antimicrobial resistance (AMR).

The Group performs an independent global advisory and advocacy role and works to maintain urgency, public support, political momentum and visibility of the AMR challenge on the global health and development agenda.

Mission statement 
"The Global Leaders Group on Antimicrobial Resistance collaborates globally with governments, agencies, civil society and the private sector through a One Health approach to advise on and advocate for prioritized political actions for the mitigation of drug resistant infections through responsible and sustainable access to and use of antimicrobials."

Background 
The Global Leaders Group on Antimicrobial Resistance was established in November 2020 following the recommendation of the Interagency Coordination Group on Antimicrobial Resistance to strengthen global political momentum and leadership on AMR. The inaugural meeting of the Group took place in January 2021.

The Quadripartite Joint Secretariat (QJS) on Antimicrobial Resistance, a joint effort by the Food and Agriculture Organization of the United Nations (FAO), the United Nations Environment Programme (UNEP),the World Health Organization (WHO), and the World Organisation for Animal Health (WOAH) provide secretariat support for the Group.

Members and Chair

Chair 
The Global Leaders Group on Antimicrobial Resistance is chaired by Her Excellency Mia Amor Mottley, Prime Minister of Barbados.

Members 
The Group includes members from across different sectors and countries  including heads of state, serving or former ministers and/or senior government officials (acting in their individual capacities), senior representatives of foundations and civil society organizations and leaders from the private sector. 

Current Group members:

 Dr Christopher Fearne, Deputy Prime Minister and Minister for Health, Member of Parliament, MALTA, GLG vice-chair
 Dr Ahmed Mohammed Obaid Al Saidi, Minister of Health, SULTANATE OF OMAN
 Mr Mohammed Mousa Alameeri, Assistant Undersecretary for the Food Diversity Sector, Ministry of Climate Change and Environment, UNITED ARAB EMIRATES
 Ms Beatrice Atim Odwong Anywar, Minister of State for Environment, UGANDA
 Prof António Correia de Campos, Former Minister of Health, Professor Emeritus of Health Economics, National School of Public Health, New University of Lisbon, PORTUGAL
 Prof C.O. Onyebuchi Chukwu, Former Minister of Health, Professor of Orthopaedic Surgery, Alex Ekwueme Federal University Ndufu Alike, NIGERIA
 Dr Guilherme Antônio da Costa Júnior, Senior Agricultural Attaché, Mission of Brazil to the European Union, Chairperson of the Codex Alimentarius Commission, BRAZIL
 Prof Dame Sally Davies, UK Special Envoy on Antimicrobial Resistance, UNITED KINGDOM
 Dr Maggie De Block, Former Minister of Social Affairs and Public Health, and Asylum and Migration, Member of Parliament, BELGIUM
 Prof Sir Jeremy James Farrar, Director, Wellcome Trust, UNITED KINGDOM
 Mr Jakob Forssmed, Minister of Social Affairs and Public Health, SWEDEN
 Ms Grace Fu, Minister for Sustainability and the Environment, Member of Parliament, SINGAPORE
 Dr Jamie Jonker, Chief Science Officer, National Milk Producers Federation (NMPF), USA
 Prof Dr Ernst Kuipers, Minister of Health, Welfare and Sport, NETHERLANDS
 Ms Sunita Narain, Director-General, Centre for Science and Environment, INDIA
 Mr Yasuhisa Shiozaki, Former Minister of Health, Labour and Welfare, Member of the House of Representatives, JAPAN
 Ms Dechen Wangmo, Minister of Health, BHUTAN
 Dr Jeffrey Scott Weese, Professor at the University of Guelph, Director of the Centre for Public Health and Zoonoses, Chief of Infection Control at Ontario Veterinary College, CANADA
 Prof Lothar H. Wieler, President of the Robert Koch Institute, GERMANY
 Ms Jennifer Zachary, Executive Vice President, General Counsel, Merck & Co., Inc., UNITED STATES OF AMERICA

Ex-officio members 

 Dr QU Dongyu, Director-General, Food and Agriculture Organization of the United Nations
 Ms Inger Anderson, Under-Secretary-General, United Nations and Executive Director, UN Environment Programme
 Dr Tedros Adhanom Ghebreyesus, Director-General, World Health Organization
 Dr Monique Eloit, Director General, World Organisation for Animal Health

Former members 

 Sheikh Hasina, Prime Minister of Bangladesh
 Ms Lena Hallengren, Minister of Health and Social Affairs, SWEDEN
 Mr Jean-Christophe Flatin, President of Innovation, Science, Technology & Mars Edge, Mars, Inc. USA
 Dr Julie Gerberding, Chief Patient Officer and Executive Vice President, Population Health & Sustainability, Merck & Co., Inc., USA
 Mr Kenneth C. Frazier Chairman of the Board and Chief Executive Officer Merck & Co., Inc., USA

See also
Antimicrobial Resistance Interdisciplinary Research Group

References

External links
Official website

Drug resistance
Antimicrobials
Organizations established in 2020